Kim Vithana (born 4 June 1970) is a British actress.

She had acted in television serials Family Pride, Specials and Firm Friends when the filmmaker Gurinder Chadha took her in Bhaji on the Beach to play the role of Ginder, a girl of Punjabi origin in England. The film brought her much recognition.

She has worked mainly in television production. Among other roles, she is known for playing an Oriental Princess in The Phoenix and the Carpet (1997), Rosie Sattar in the television series Holby City from 2003 to 2005, Mike Baldwin's feisty solicitor Frances (Frankie) Stillman (1997-1998) and Doctor Bannerjee/Saira Habeeb in Coronation Street, and Yvonne in Always and Everyone. She has also appeared in Casualty, EastEnders, Cracker, Love Hurts, Dangerfield and North Square.  In 2004 she played Beth Downing in “Multistorey”, a two part episode of Waking the Dead.

Vithana has also worked on the Silver Street radio programme on the BBC Asian Network.

External links
 
 Kim Vithana at Holby City
 Kim Vithana at Creative Arts Management

1970 births
English film actresses
English soap opera actresses
Living people
Actresses from Nottinghamshire
Actors from Nottingham
English people of Sri Lankan descent